Symbrion (Symbiotic Evolutionary Robot Organisms) is a project funded by the European Commission between 2008 and 2013 to develop a framework in which a homogeneous swarm of miniature interdependent robots can co-assemble into a larger robotic organism to gain problem-solving momentum.

One of the key aspects of Symbrion is inspired by the biological world: an artificial genome that allows storing and evolution of suboptimal configurations in order to increase the speed of adaptation. 

The SYMBRION project does not start from zero; previous development and research from projects I-SWARM and the open-source SWARMROBOT serve as a mounting point. A large part of the developments within Symbrion is open-source and open-hardware.

Co-operating universities 
 Universität Stuttgart, Germany (Coordination)
 Universität Graz, Austria
 Vrije Universiteit, Netherlands
 Universität Karlsruhe, Germany
 Flanders Institute of Biotechnology, Belgium
 University of the West of England, Bristol, UK
 Eberhard Karls Universität Tübingen, Germany
 University of York, UK
 Université Libre de Bruxelles, Belgium
 Institut National de Recherche en Informatique et Automatique, France
 Czech Technical University in Prague, Czech Republic

See also
 Swarm robotics

External links 
 Symbrion homepage 

Robotics projects
Multi-robot systems
2008 in robotics